Umoja, the Swahili word for "unity", may refer to:

Umoja, the first of The Seven Principles (Nguzo Saba), celebrated and highlighted each day of the Kwanzaa holiday celebration
Umoja, Kenya, an all-female village founded on the principles of women's rights
Umoja: The Village Where Men Are Forbidden, a 2008 French documentary about Umoja, Kenya
Umoja, Nairobi, a suburb of Nairobi, the capital of Kenya
, a Lake Victoria ferry in East Africa
Umoja, a 60 class locomotive of the East African Railways
Operation Umoja Wetu, the name for the 2009 Eastern Congo offensive
Umoja Village, a former shanty town in the Liberty City neighborhood of Miami, Florida
Umoja, a music album released in 2006 by Dutch pop band Bløf
Umoja Party, a political party active in Washington, D.C. from 1994 to 2000
Akinyele Umoja (born 1954), American educator and author
Umoja (software), enterprise resource planning software used by the UN